Evorthodus is a genus of gobies native to the Atlantic coast from Chesapeake Bay, United States, to northern South America and along the Pacific coast of Panama and Ecuador.

Species
There are currently two recognized species in this genus:
 Evorthodus lyricus (Girard, 1858) (Lyre goby)
 Evorthodus minutus Meek & Hildebrand, 1928 (Small goby)

References

Gobionellinae